The Voice (Chinese: 决战好声; pinyin: Juézhàn hǎo shēng) is a Chinese-language Malaysian-Singaporean reality talent show and a version of The Voice format created by John de Mol. The series premiered on Mandarin Chinese-language Singaporean channels StarHub TV and E City as well as on a Mandarin Chinese-Language Malaysian channel, Astro AEC. It was hosted by Siow Hui Mei and Wong Hoon Hong. The coaches were Sky Wu, Della Ding, Hanjin Tan and Gary Chaw.

Format 
The show's format features four stages of competition: blind auditions, battle rounds, knockouts, and live performance shows.

Blind auditions 
The four judges/coaches choose teams of contestants through a blind audition process. Each judge has the length of the auditioner's performance to decide if he or she wants that singer on his or her team. If two or more judges want the same singer (as happens frequently), the singer has the final choice of coach.

The Battles 
Each team of singers is mentored and developed by its coach. In the second stage, called the Battle Round, coaches will pair up two of their artists to battle against each other in a duet arrangement, after that the coach had to choose one of them to advance the next round, which is called Knockout Round. After making the decision from the coach, other coaches can steal the losing artists. Each coach can save two losing artists from another team.

The Knockouts 
In the third stage, called the Knockout Round, the 8 remaining artists of each team will be pair up with their coach and have a player-killing arrangement. Unlike the Battles, artists have to pick a song (or chosen by his/her coach) and have a solo performance, after which the coach need to choose one of them as a winner and advance to the Live Shows. There is no steal for this round, so the other coaches are not allowed to steal the losing artist to their teams

The Live Shows 
The winners of the Knockouts will advance to this round. In the week one performance, the arrangement in this round is similar to the live playoffs from the U.S. version, but there has the highest public votes receiver can advance to the next round (U.S. version can bring 2 highest votes artists), and the coach can save one of the remaining artists. And the coming week is the live finale, the top two artists of each team will perform a solo song, and only two artists of all teams can advance to the "final showdown", which all the cumulative votes will be reset in this round. The highest public votes receiver in the "final showdown" will be The Voice winner.
EDITED

Coaches 
In 6 June 2017, The Voice officially announced that Hanjin Tan, Della Ding, Gary Chaw and Sky Wu would be the coaches for the series.

Season overview 

  Team Hanjin
  Team Della
  Team Gary
  Team Sky

Season synopses 
Names in bold type indicate the winner of the season.

Season 1 

The first and only season of The Voice premiered on 17 September 2017. The coaching panel included Hanjin Tan, Della Ding, Gary Chaw, and Sky Wu. Show Hui Wei and Wong Woon Hong appeared as the host, which William Tan and Wei Long as the V-reporter. Lim Wen Suen was announced as the winner with Kenny Low in second place.

Each coach was allowed to advance four top to the live shows:

Extended links 

Official website

Malaysian reality television series
Singaporean reality television series
Singapore and Malaysia